The 2007 Nigerian House of Representatives elections in Nasarawa State was held on April 21, 2007, to elect members of the House of Representatives to represent Nasarawa State, Nigeria.

Overview

Summary

Results

Brass/Nembe 
PDP candidate Nelson Belief won the election, defeating other party candidates.

Ogbia 
PDP candidate Clever Ikisikpo won the election, defeating other party candidates.

Sagbama/Ekeremor  
PDP candidate Henry Seriake Dickson won the election, defeating other party candidates.

Southern Ijaw 
PDP candidate Egberibin Donald Jacob won the election, defeating other party candidates.

Yenagoa/Kolokuna/Opokuma  
PDP candidate Warman Weri Ogoriba won the election, defeating other party candidates.

References 

Bayelsa State House of Representatives elections
House of Representatives
April 2007 events in Nigeria